Sports equipment, sporting equipment, also called sporting goods, are the tools, materials, apparel, and gear used to compete in a sport and varies depending on the sport. The equipment ranges from balls, nets, and protective gear like helmets. Sporting equipment can be used as protective gear or a tool used to help the athletes play the sport. Over time, sporting equipment has evolved because sports have started to require more protective gear to prevent injuries. Sporting equipment may be found in any department store or specific sporting equipment shops.

History and development of sports 
Historically many sports players have developed their own sporting equipment over time. For instance, the use of a football dates back to ancient China, between 225 BC and 220 AD. As football remains the most popular sport in the 21st century, the material of the ball has completely changed over the centuries; from being made out of animal skin, to being lined with multiple layers of polyester or cotton.

As the sporting equipment industry improves, so does the athletes performance. This is due to the fact that the equipment is more efficient, lighter and stronger it forming a bio-mechanical system, interacting with the athlete.

Since the massive adoption of wearable, new sport equipment tend to be electronics and connected to deliver data performances.

Standards and monitoring processes apply in certain industries aimed at elimination of child labour in the manufacture of sports goods, for example the Atlanta Agreement of 1997 in relation to child labour in the football-making industry in Pakistan.

Game equipment

Balls

The ball is often what a sport requires and revolves around. A sports ball is typically round, but can also be in the shape such as association football, American football, baseball and basketball, or the ball is named after the sport. Other cases are the Gaelic ball. In other cases, the name of the sport is indicated, just as the cricket ball, golf ball, lacrosse ball or tennis ball.

Flying discs
Flying discs are used for various games such as freestyle, disc golf and ultimate.

Goal posts
In many games, goal posts are at each end of the playing field, there are two vertical posts (or uprights) supporting a horizontal crossbar. In some games, such as football, hockey or water polo, the object is to pass the ball or puck between the posts below the crossbar, while in others, such as those based on rugby, the ball must pass over the crossbar instead.

Nets
Nets are used for tennis, volleyball, football, basketball, hockey and badminton. A different type of net is used for various forms of fishing.

Racquets
Racquets are used for racquet sports such as tennis, squash and badminton, and are used to hit a ball between opposing players or teams.

Rods and tackle
Fishing rods and fishing tackle are primarily used for fishing and sport fishing.

Sticks, bats and clubs
Sticks are used for sports such as hockey and lacrosse. Bats are used for sports such as baseball, cricket and rounders (UK). Clubs are used mainly for golf (Golf club)

Wickets and bases
Wickets, creases and balls are used in cricket, and bases are used in baseball.

Player equipment

Footwear

Footwear for sports includes:
 Boards for surfing, skateboarding, wakeboarding and snowboarding
 Cricket spikes
 Road cycling shoes
 Flat pedal shoes and clipless shoes for mountain biking
 Football boots 
 Golf shoes
 Prosthetics like the Cheetah Flex-Foot running blade
 Skates for sports like roller skating, roller blading and ice skating
 Skis for skiing and water skiing
 Running shoes
 Track spikes
 Walking shoes

Protective equipment

Protective equipment is often worn for sports including motor sport and contact sports, such as ice hockey and American football or sports where there is a danger of injury through collision of players or other objects. Protective equipment includes:
 Bicycle helmet
 Football helmet
 Elbow pads
 Jock strap
 Mouthguards
 Shin pads
 Shoulder pads
 Ski suits

Sports gloves

Training equipment
Examples for training equipment include swiss balls, resistance bands, balance discs, weights, chin-up bars, equipment for the gym. Also protective equipment such as weight lifting belts and bench shirts for weight training and powerlifting.

Special sports equipment
Special sports equipment, is the equipment usually worn by the athletes according to their needs or desires.
Special equipment in sports branches:
Cycling:
Cycling jersey: a sleeved jersey covering the upper torso.
Bib shorts: the shorts worn by cyclists which come with pads for added comfort.
Socks: typically mid length socks.
Cycling shoes: specialised shoes with stiff soles for more efficient energy transfer and cleats cliping into clipless pedals.
Football:
Football leggings: Football leggings, mostly used in winter. It is used to prevent the body from getting cold and injury due to the cold weather after warm-up training in winter.
Football captain's tape: Football captain's tape, is a compulsory (need) piece of equipment. Football captains are chosen by the coach, the accessory provided must be worn by the captain.
Football shinguard: Football shinguard, is a special piece of equipment, that football players wear according to their specific wishes.
Football bracelet: Football bracelet, is a special need equipment and players write the name of a family member or loved one according to their wishes.
 Football footband: Football footband, is worn by footballers in the ankle area between the crampons and the toe and is need or for pleasure.
 Football visor: Football visor, is a piece of plastic attached to the facemask of the football helmet. It helps prevent damage to the eyes and face. 
Volleyball:
 Volleyball wristband: Volleyball wristband, is mostly used by volleyball players. Volleyball players use it for better grip of their hands.
 Volleyball knee pads: Volleyball knee pads, is the equipment used by volleyball players to protect their knees, when they jump high, jump sideways and fall to the ground.
 Volleyball leg pads: Volleyball leg pads, allows volleyball players to play safely.
 Basketball:
 Basketball sleeve: Basketball sleeve, is a piece of equipment that basketball players wear according to their wishes and tastes and is not mandatory.
 Basketball armband: Basketball armband, is a piece of equipment that basketball players use according to their tastes or needs.
 Basketball headband: Basketball headband, is a piece of equipment that basketball players wear according to their wishes and tastes and is not mandatory.
 Basketball handband: Basketball handband, is like a need for basketball players to protect their hands and grip the ball more comfortably, but it is not mandatory.
 Basketball bracelet: Basketball bracelet, is a piece of equipment, that is generally used only as an accessory by basketball players.
 Tennis:
 Tennis armband: It is a non-mandatory accessory worn by tennis players.
 Tennis hair band: Tennis headband, is an accessory especially used by athletes according to their own color and taste.
 Tennis hat: The tennis hat is often used by tennis athletes. Used as an accessory.

Vehicles
Vehicles (sometimes specialized) are used as equipment for some sports, including motor sport, cycling, aeronautics, sailing and hot air ballooning.

Small vehicles with flatbeds are often used to carry injured athletes off the field, most commonly in American football.

Various sports 

 :Category:Sports equipment (various sports)
 Association football clothing and equipment
 Baseball clothing and equipment
 Climbing equipment
 Cricket clothing and equipment
 Cycling kit
 Golf equipment
 Gridiron football equipment
 Ice hockey equipment
 Rugby shirt
 Snowboarding equipment
 Triathlon equipment

References

See also

 Equipment
 Equipment manager
 Outdoor gym
 Protective equipment
 Chin-up bar
 Athletic Equipment Managers Association
 Protective gear in sports